Lee Jun or Ri Jun may refer to:

 Yi Tjoune (1859–1907), Korean prosecutor and diplomat
 Joon Lee (born 1972), Korean American rapper
 Lee Joon (born 1988), South Korean actor
 Lee Jun (footballer) (born 1997), South Korean footballer